William Henry Skinner (1838–1915) was a Welsh-born architect who migrated to New Zealand.

Biography
Skinner was born in 1838 in Newport, Wales. He was the second son of John Skinner, builder of 'Barnstable and Lynton' North Devon. He grew up in England and attended the department of science and art at the Imperial College London. He was awarded a bronze medal for 'success in art' in 1859.

He arrived in Auckland, New Zealand, on 18 August 1859, by the ship 'Joseph Fletcher'. On 21 December the same year, Skinner joined the Royal Rifle Volunteers, and served during the earlier part of the New Zealand Wars. He was gazetted Ensign of the Royal Company on 18 January 1868; Lieutenant commanding No. 2 Company, Auckland Rifle Volunteers on 2 July 1874; Sub-Lieutenant Victoria Company on 2 November 1875; Lieutenant on 18 May 1880; Captain on 7 November 1885; Adjutant on 25 October 1886; and Major on 21 November 1889.

Major Skinner held the Imperial decoration for long service, and also New Zealand war and long service medals; and he was selected to represent New Zealand at the Intercolonial Rifle Match in Melbourne in 1873, and also in 1888.

After his arrival in the colony, Major Skinner worked as a builder and contractor. From 1880, he practised as an architect, and designed and carried out several important buildings in Auckland and Thames, New Zealand.

He also helped establish an early gymnasium and singing classes in Auckland; held the position of precentor at the Newton Presbyterian Church for over ten years; was an active member of the Orpheus Glee Club and several choirs; and was one of the founders of the Auckland technical school.

Projects
Star printing office (demolished)
Onehunga Woollen Works
Freemasons' Hall on Princes Street, Auckland
St James Presbyterian Church, Thames
St Paul's Anglican Church, Symonds Street, Auckland (1894–1895)
Temporary St Paul's Church, Eden Crescent, Auckland (1885) which is now part of the Church of the Holy Sepulchre complex on Khyber Pass Road.

References

Welsh architects
People from Newport, Wales
1838 births
1915 deaths
20th-century New Zealand architects
19th-century Welsh architects